Faulconer is a surname. Notable people with the surname include:

Adam Faulconer – fictional character in "The Starbuck Chronicles"
Bruce Faulconer – American composer
Kevin Faulconer – former mayor of San Diego

See also
 Falconer (surname)
Faulkner (surname)
Falkner (disambiguation)
Fawkner (disambiguation)
Faulknor (disambiguation)
 The Starbuck Chronicles, where a fictional Faulconer County and Faulconer family are key plot elements